The Pedagogical Institute of Irkutsk State University was founded in 1909 in Irkutsk, Siberia as Irkutsk Teaching Institute for training teachers for schools and colleges. The Institute has 3 faculties and 21 departments, and provides education in 9 training directions.

Minor plant 2585 Irpedina, discovered by Soviet astronomer and a graduate of the Institute Nikolay Chernykh, is named after the Institute (Chernykh's wife, Lyudmila Chernykh, was also an astronomer and a graduate of the Institute).

References

Educational institutions established in 1909
1909 establishments in the Russian Empire
Irkutsk State University
Teachers colleges in Russia